Haugen is a Norwegian surname. Notable people with the surname include:

People with the surname tend to come from Norwegian descent.

Academics
 Einar Haugen (1906–1994), American linguist, author and university professor
 Håvard Jostein Haugen, Norwegian materials scientist
 Odd Einar Haugen (born 1954), Norwegian philologist
 Robert Haugen (1942-2013), American professor of finance

Artists
 Arne Haugen Sørensen (born 1932), Danish illustrator
 Jørgen Haugen Sørensen (born 1934), Danish sculptor

Performers
 Andrea Haugen (1969–2021), Norwegian recording artist known under her artist name of Nebelhexë 
 Kim Haugen (born 1958), Norwegian actor, son of Per Theodor Haugen
 Lars Håvard Haugen (born 1969), Norwegian guitarist
 Per Theodor Haugen (1932-2018), Norwegian actor
Tomas Thormodsæter Haugen, musician who performs under the name Samoth
 Sandra Lyng Haugen (born 1987), Norwegian singer
 Tomas Thormodsæter Haugen (born 1974), Norwegian musician

Politicians
 Arne L. Haugen (born 1939), Norwegian politician
 Einar Kristian Haugen (1905–1968), Norwegian politician for the Labour Party
 Gilbert N. Haugen (1859–1933), American politician, co-sponsor of the McNary–Haugen Farm Relief Bill
 Helga Haugen (born 1932), Norwegian politician for the Christian Democratic Party
 Ingvald Haugen (1894–1958), Norwegian union leader and politician for the Labour Party
 Mary Margaret Haugen (born 1941), American politician, Washington state senator
 Nils P. Haugen (1849–1931), American politician, U.S. Representative from Wisconsin
 Tore Haugen (born 1932), Norwegian politician for the Conservative Party of Norway

Sportspeople
 Anders Haugen (1888–1984), Norwegian-American ski jumping champion
 Arild Haugen (born 1985), Norwegian strongman
 Arve Haugen (born 1943), Norwegian cyclist
 Fredrik Haugen (born 1992), Norwegian footballer
 Greg Haugen (born 1960), American World Boxing Champion
 Helge Haugen (born 1982), Norwegian footballer
 Herman Haugen (born 2000), Norwegian footballer
 Kjartan Haugen (born 1975), Norwegian cross-country skier
 Kristoffer Haugen (born 1994), Norwegian footballer
 Lars Haugen (born 1987), Norwegian hockey player
 Leif Kristian Haugen (born 1987), Norwegian alpine ski racer
 Michael Haugen Jr. (born 1966), American bowler 
 Per Haugen (born 1970), Norwegian windsurfer
 Ragnar Haugen (1911–1964), Norwegian boxer who competed in the 1936 Summer Olympics
 Sigurd Hauso Haugen (born 1997), Norwegian footballer
 Sofie Karoline Haugen (born 1995), Norwegian speed skater
 Stein Haugen (1933-2008), Norwegian discus thrower 
 Tone Haugen (born 1964), Norwegian footballer and Olympic medalist
 Tormod Bjørnetun Haugen (born 1988), Norwegian speed skater
 Villy Haugen (born 1944), Norwegian speed skater, earned a bronze medal in the 1964 Winter Olympics

Writers
 Eva Lund Haugen (1907–1996), American author and editor
 Paal-Helge Haugen (born 1945), Norwegian lyricist, novelist, dramatist, writer
 Tormod Haugen (1945–2008), Norwegian author
 Marty Haugen (1950- ), composer of liturgical music

Others
 Frances Haugen, American data engineer and scientist, product manager, and whistleblower 
Gary Haugen (born 1963 or 1964), American lawyer and social activist, CEO of International Justice Mission
 Marty Haugen (born 1950), American composer of sacred popular music
 Odd Seim-Haugen (1937-2015), Norwegian barrister and sports official
 Orin D. Haugen (1907–1945), United States Army Colonel

Toponymic surnames
Norwegian-language surnames